Sure Love is the third studio album American country music artist Hal Ketchum. It was released in 1992 (see 1992 in country music) on Curb Records. The album produced four chart singles on the Billboard Hot Country Singles & Tracks (now Hot Country Songs) charts. In order of release, these were the title track, "Hearts Are Gonna Roll", "Mama Knows the Highway", and "Someplace Far Away" (which was re-titled "Someplace Far Away (Careful What You're Dreaming)" upon release to radio). Respectively, these reached #3, #2, #8, and #24 on the country charts.

Track listing

Personnel
Hal Ketchum - lead vocals
Richard Bennett – acoustic guitar
Gary Burr – harmony vocals (tracks 1, 2, 4, 6, 10)
Bruce Bouton – pedal steel guitar (track 6, 10)
Keith Carper – harmony vocals (track 9)
Stuart Duncan – mandolin (track 2)
Kirk "Jellyroll" Johnson – harmonica (track 10)
Chris Leuzinger – electric guitar, slide guitar, acoustic guitar
Bill Miller – Woodland Indian courtship flute (track 9)
Joey Miskulin – accordion (track 7)
Scott Neubert – harmony vocals (track 9)
Debbie Nims – harmony vocals (track 5)
Milton Sledge – drums
Pete Wasner – keyboards
Bob Wray – bass guitar
Trisha Yearwood – harmony vocals (track 3)
Technical
Mark Miller - engineer
Denny Purcell - mastering

Chart performance

References

Allmusic (see infobox)

1992 albums
Albums produced by Allen Reynolds
Curb Records albums
Hal Ketchum albums